Bicyclus similis is a butterfly in the family Nymphalidae. It is found in western Tanzania. The habitat consists of montane forests.

The larvae possibly feed on bamboo.

References

Elymniini
Butterflies described in 1963
Endemic fauna of Tanzania
Butterflies of Africa